Hoseynabad-e Akhund or Hoseynabad Akhvond may refer to:
 Hoseynabad-e Akhund, Kerman
 Hoseynabad-e Akhund, Zarand, Kerman Province